The Bombardier Innovia APM 300R C801B (APM 300R) is the third generation of an automated people mover (APM) train built by CRRC Puzhen Alstom Transportation Systems (joint venture of Alstom [formerly Bombardier Transportation] and CRRC Nanjing Puzhen) for the Bukit Panjang LRT line, to replace the existing C801 trains built in 1999. The C801B trains are also the first of its kind to reuse the retro AC third rail shoes compared to the newer Light Rail lines around the world that utilises the APM 300 system that have been built with DC third rail instead of AC.

Overview 
As the aging first generation trains drew near to its deadline service of 20 years, the LTA decided that the first generation trains were due for replacement instead of a refurbishment. This is in part of their renewal programme for the next 10 years for the BPLRT, including rail replacement and signalling upgrades. The LTA then awarded the project to Bombardier Transportation (the manufacturer of the BPLRT train cars at the time, now merged with Alstom) to procure 19 replacement train cars for the BPLRT. However, instead of using back the same technology for the train line, the LTA opted for Bombardier's latest technology on the Innovia system - Innovia APM 300. It is said to be much more reliable in many ways, including a much more robust braking and propulsion system, a higher reliability air conditioning system and many more. But with the BPLRT line utilising the same third rail technology as the APM 100, modification works on the APM 300 cars were done to work with AC third rail power supply. Hence, APM 300R was created, specifically for such conditions. The new trains were revealed on 3 December 2019, spotting a sleeker design and enhanced features.

Unlike the CX-100 C801 and APM 100 C801A, the APM 300R C801B will feature more efficient MITrac AC traction motors and VVVF inverters, controlled by transistors instead of thyristors.

Train formation 
The configuration of a C801B in revenue service is just the one car. With both the motors and the third rail current collectors, the train cars can be coupled up to 2 cars during service.

The car numbers of the trains range from 133 to 151. Individual cars are assigned a three-digit serial number by the rail operator SMRT Trains. A trainset consists of one motor car, e.g. set 133 is car 133. The first digit is always a 1, while the last two digits identify the car number.
 Bombardier Transportation (now Alstom) and CRRC Nanjing Puzhen built sets 133–151.

References 

Bombardier Transportation people movers
Innovia people movers

Bombardier Transportation multiple units
Light Rail Transit (Singapore) rolling stock